The Tourbet el Bey is a Tunisian royal mausoleum in the southwest of the medina of Tunis.

It is the last resting place of most of the Husainid dynasty rulers of Tunisia.  Among those not buried there are the last two - Moncef Bey, who is buried in the Jellaz Cemetery and Lamine Bey who is buried in La Marsa. The building,  constructed in the reign of Ali II ibn Hussein (1759-1782) is the largest funerary monument in Tunis. The first tourba of Al-Husayn I ibn Ali stands opposite it.

Royal mausoleum 
The building is topped with domes, the main ones covered with green tortoiseshell-shaped tiles, and the facades are of ochre sandstone, decorated at regular intervals by pilasters and Italian-style entablatures in light-coloured stone. They correspond with the different funerary chambers inside which house the tombs of the ruling family and their wives, as well as of a number of their ministers and servants. The tombs, dug into the ground, are covered with marble chests ornamented in bas relief. The sarcophagi of the men have regularly-shaped columns bearing inscriptions, topped with a fez or a turban. Those of the women have marble plaques at each end, one of which carries an inscription.

Architecture and interior decoration 
The monument is entered through a large hall which shows a distinct Italian influence in its decoration, mixed with Ottoman style, notably in the chamber of the beys. The mausoleum, which comprises eight funerary chambers covered with cupolas, is built around two patios.  These are covered in slabs, and surrounded by porticos which rest on pillars of Carrara marble with neo-doric capitals. These patios open, on each side, into a funerary chamber.  Some of these chambers are also linked directly to each other.

The south-west side opens into the chamber of the Beys, the most important chamber in the complex, housing the tombs of thirteen reigning Beys. The chamber is square, with walls fifteen metres long, and it replicates the proportions of an Ottoman mosque: four large cruciform pillars support a large central cupola which is slightly bulbous in form and flanked by four demi-cupolas on the sides and four in the corners. The only other building with this form in the medina of Tunis is the Sidi Mahrez mosque. The intricate decoration of the room blends Italian, Ottoman and local influences; the lower parts of the walls and the pillars are covered in panels of polychrome marble marquetry to a height of 2.5 metres, while finely-sculpted plaster lines the caps of the cupolas.

The ceilings of the mausoleum, either vaults or cupolas, are ornamented with stucco in geometric or plant designs. Some of these are polychrome, with the richness of the colours denoting the rank of the people buried in the chamber. One in particular is surprising in its architectural form - a large oval cupola.  The walls are generally covered with ceramic tiles in orange and yellow hues, some of which were imported from Italy, particularly from Naples, while others are of local manufacture, from the Qallaline workshops.  The chamber of the reigning Beys is the only one richly decorated with polychrome marble in the Italian style.

Conservation 

For around thirty years the tourbet was abandoned and even partly squatted for a time and its roof structures and rich decorations deteriorated. In the 1990s the National Heritage Institute
(INP) began restoration work and opened a ticket office to allow visitors. Nevertheless, it seems that the upkeep of the building continues to leave much to be desired. Care of this monument depends ultimately on the Tunisian Culture Ministry through the National Heritage Institute and the Agency for the Development of National Heritage and Cultural Promotion.

See also
(buried in Tourbet el Bey)
Mustapha Dinguizli
M'hamed Djellouli
Mustapha Khaznadar

References

Further reading 
 Mohamed El Aziz Ben Achour, « Tourbet-el-Bey, sépulture des beys et de la famille husaynite à Tunis », IBLA, 1985

External links 
  video of the interior of Tourbet El Bey
  virtual visit to the Tourbet El Bey
 Agency for the Development of National Heritage and Cultural Protection
  UNESCO site on the Tunis Medina

Medina of Tunis
Tunisian monarchy
Buildings and structures in Tunis